Aleksandr Sednyov (born 16 August 1973) is a Belarusian association football coach and former defender. He is the manager of Ordabasy in Kazakhstan.

Honours
MPKC Mozyr
Belarusian Premier League champion: 1996
Belarusian Cup winner: 1995–96

Belshina Bobruisk
Belarusian Premier League champion: 2001
Belarusian Cup winner: 2000–01

References

External links
 Profile at Belshina website
 

1973 births
Living people
People from Mogilev
Belarusian footballers
Association football defenders
Belarusian expatriate footballers
FC Dnepr Mogilev players
FC Torpedo Mogilev players
FC Chernomorets Novorossiysk players
Russian Premier League players
FC Slavia Mozyr players
FC Transmash Mogilev players
FC Baltika Kaliningrad players
FC Torpedo Minsk players
FC Belshina Bobruisk players
FC BATE Borisov players
FC Naftan Novopolotsk players
Expatriate footballers in Russia
Belarusian football managers
Belarusian expatriate football managers
Expatriate football managers in Kazakhstan
FC Belshina Bobruisk managers
FC Dinamo Minsk managers
FC Dnepr Mogilev managers
FC Aktobe managers
FC Rukh Brest managers
FC Ordabasy managers
Sportspeople from Mogilev Region